The 1982–83 Southern Football League season was the 80th in the history of the league, an English football competition.

This season saw the reintroduction of the Premier Division. AP Leamington won the Premier Division, winning their first Southern League title, whilst Kidderminster Harriers was promoted to the Alliance Premier League. Cheltenham Town, Folkestone, Sutton Coldfield Town, Fisher Athletic were all promoted to the Premier Division, the last two for the first time in their history.

Premier Division
The Premier Division was reformed and consisted of the best clubs from the Midland and the Southern divisions. It also featured three new clubs, relegated from the Alliance Premier League:
AP Leamington
Dartford
Gravesend & Northfleet

At the end of the season Enderby Town changed name to Leicester United.

League table

Midland Division
After the Premier Division reintroduction at the end of the previous season, the Midland Division consisted of 17 clubs, including 11 clubs from the previous season Midland Division and six new clubs:
Three clubs joined from the West Midlands (Regional) League
Dudley Town
Sutton Coldfield Town
Willenhall Town

Plus:
Bridgwater Town, joined from the Western Football League
Oldbury United, joined from the Midland Football Combination
Forest Green Rovers, joined from the Hellenic Football League

League table

Southern Division
After the Premier Division reintroduction at the end of the previous season, the Southern Division consisted of 18 clubs, including 14 clubs from the previous season Southern Division and four new clubs:
Erith & Belvedere, joined from the Kent Football League
Fisher Athletic, joined from the London Spartan League
Road-Sea Southampton, joined from the City of Southampton Sunday League
Woodford Town, joined from the Athenian League

League table

See also
 Southern Football League
 1982–83 Isthmian League
 1982–83 Northern Premier League

References
RSSF – Southern Football League archive

Southern Football League seasons
6